= Kizoura =

Town in ancient Bithynia

Coordinates: 40°28′10″N 30°15′20″E

Kizoura was a town of ancient Bithynia. Its name does not occur in ancient authors but is inferred from epigraphic and other evidence.

Its site is tentatively located near Umurbey in Asiatic Turkey.
